The YJ-83 (NATO reporting name: CSS-N-8 Saccade) is a Chinese subsonic anti-ship cruise missile. It is manufactured by the China Aerospace Science and Industry Corporation Third Academy.

Description
The YJ-83 uses microprocessors and a strapdown inertial reference unit (IRU); these are more compact than the equivalent electronics used in the YJ-8 and the export C-802, allowing the YJ-83 to have a 180-km range at Mach 0.9. The missile is powered by the Chinese CTJ-2 turbojet, and carries 190-kg high-explosive fragmentation warhead. Terminal guidance is by an active radar.

The air-launched YJ-83K has a range of 180-km, a cruise speed of Mach 0.9, and a 165 kg high-explosive, semi-armour piercing warhead. The improved YJ-83KH uses a imaging-infrared seeker and has a range of 230 km; reportedly it may receive course corrections by remote link.

The YJ-83 entered service with the People's Liberation Army Navy in 1998-1999, equipping large numbers of its surface warships. The YJ-83K is the standard anti-ship missile carried by the People's Liberation Army Naval Air Force; the United States reported the usage in 2014. The People's Liberation Army Air Force was using the YJ-83K by February 2020.

Operational history

On 14 July 2006 during the 2006 Lebanon War, Hezbollah fired two Chinese-built C-802 missiles with upgraded Iranian radar seekers. The first hit a Cambodian-flagged Egyptian freighter 60 km offshore. The other hit the Israeli Navy's Sa'ar 5-class corvette INS Hanit, which was patrolling 8.5 nm offshore of Beirut. The missile hit the corvette's unstealthy crane near the rear helicopter pad; the explosion holed the pad, set fire to fuel storage, and killed four crewmembers. The fire was extinguished after four hours and Hanit returned to Ashdod under its own power for three weeks of repairs. The corvette's automatic anti-missile systems were deactivated before the attack; Israel was unaware that Hezbollah had C-802s, and there were concerns over friendly fire with the Israeli Air Force.

On 9 October 2016, the United States Navy guided-missile destroyer USS Mason (DDG-87) reported being under attack in the Red Sea by cruise missiles fired from territory in Yemen controlled by the Houthi group. The missiles appeared similar to one fired from Yemen a week earlier that damaged HSV-2 Swift, a leased transport ship under the control of the United Arab Emirates, who are supporting the Yemeni government in a civil war against the Houthis. Analysis of the damage caused by that missile led experts to believe it was a C-802. None of the missiles fired at USS Mason hit their targets; U.S. authorities claimed that defensive countermeasures were used, including firing defensive missiles.

C-802A

The C-802 precedes the closely related YJ-83. The C-802 is considered a part of the YJ-83 family by the US military. The C-802 is sometimes and erroneously considered the export version of the YJ-82; the two are separate developments.

The C-802A and C-802AK are the export surface- and air-launched variants.

Variants
YJ-83
Initial surface-launched version with 120km range.

YJ-83A/YJ-83J
Variant with enhanced range; 180 km for surface-launch and 250 km for air-launch.

YJ-83K
Air-launched variant with 180km range.

YJ-83KH
Air-launched variant with imaging-infrared seeker and 230 km.

C-802
Predecessor of the YJ-83.

C-802A
Export variant of the surface-launched YJ-83.

C-802K
Export version of the air-launched YJ-83.

Operators

Algerian National Navy: C-802, C-802A

Bangladesh Navy: C-802, C-802A

Indonesian Navy: C-802

Islamic Republic of Iran Navy: C-802 and an Iranian copy called Noor

Myanmar Navy: C-802
Myanmar Air Force: C-802A

Pakistan Air Force: C-802AK
Pakistan Navy: C-802, C-802A

People's Liberation Army Air Force
People's Liberation Army Navy
People's Liberation Army Naval Air Force

Syrian Arab Navy: C-802

Royal Thai Navy: C-802A

Yemeni Navy: C-802

Bolivarian Navy of Venezuela: C-802A (ordered)

See also
Noor and Ghader, derivative of the C-802 produced by Iran
Exocet
Harpoon
Kh-35
Otomat
RBS-15
R-360 Neptune

References

Bibliography

 

Guided missiles of the People's Republic of China
Weapons of the People's Republic of China
Air-to-surface missiles
Anti-ship cruise missiles of the People's Republic of China
Military equipment introduced in the 1990s